George Schneider may refer to:

 Georg Abraham Schneider (1770–1839), German composer and instrumentalist
 George J. Schneider (1877–1939), U.S. Representative from Wisconsin
 George Schneider (banker) (1823–1905), Illinois journalist and banker
 George Schneider, recipient of the U.S. Medal of Honor for an action on July 30, 1864 (see List of American Civil War Medal of Honor recipients: Q–S)
 George Yurii Schneider (1908–2002), Ukrainian-American professor, linguist, philologist, literary historian, and literary critic of Jewish heritage.

See also
 Schneider (surname)
 Georg Schneider (disambiguation)
 Georges Schneider (1925–1963), Swiss alpine skier